Tamara Stocks Lee (born January 29, 1979), née Tamara Stocks, is an American former college and professional basketball player who was a forward and center in the Women's National Basketball Association (WNBA) for a single season in 2001.  Stocks played college basketball for the University of Florida, and thereafter, played professionally for the Washington Mystics of the WNBA. She currently serves as public relations coordinator for B'Ball 101, LLC, an Atlanta-based player/athlete development company, and its non-profit, the Saved By The Ball Foundation, Inc..

Early life
Stocks was born in Akron, Ohio. She played for Pickerington High School in Pickerington, Ohio, where she was named a high school All-American by the Women's Basketball Coaches Association.. She participated in the WBCA High School All-America Game where she scored eight points.

College career
At the University of Florida, Stocks became one of the Florida Gators women's basketball team's all-time leaders in points and rebounds.. She is the first ever high school NIKE/WBCA All-American to sign with the Gators..

Professional career
She graduated in 2001 and was selected 25th overall in the first round of the 2001 WNBA Draft by the Washington Mystics. She played only one season in the WNBA.

In 2006, Stocks signed with Grindavík of the Icelandic Úrvalsdeild kvenna. She played Grindavík's last two regular season games, averaging 33.5 points, 15.0 rebounds and 4.0 blocks per game. In the playoffs, she averaged 29.5 points and 16.0 rebounds but was unable to prevent Grindavík from being knocked out by Keflavík in the semi-finals.

Personal life
Her father, James Stocks, was the first African-American basketball player to graduate from Murray State University.. He also played for the Kentucky Colonels of the American Basketball Association (ABA)..

She resides in Atlanta, Georgia with her husband, Dorian A. Lee, and their 3 sons..

Florida statistics
Source

See also 

 List of Florida Gators in the WNBA
 List of University of Florida alumni

References

External links 
 WNBA Player Profile for Tamara Stocks
 
 
 

1979 births
Living people
American expatriate basketball people in China
American expatriate basketball people in Croatia
American expatriate basketball people in Iceland
American expatriate basketball people in Spain
American women's basketball players
Basketball players from Akron, Ohio
Centers (basketball)
Florida Gators women's basketball players
Grindavík women's basketball players
Parade High School All-Americans (girls' basketball)
Shanghai Swordfish players
Úrvalsdeild kvenna basketball players
Washington Mystics draft picks
Washington Mystics players